Monographella is a genus of fungi in the family Amphisphaeriaceae. The teleomorph is Microdochium.

References

External links
 Index Fungorum

Xylariales